Universidad  (Spanish for "university") may refer to:

Places 

 Universidad, San Juan, Puerto Rico
 Universidad (Madrid)

Football clubs 

 Universidad SC, a Guatemalan football club that represents the Universidad de San Carlos de Guatemala
 Universidad Católica, Chilean football club
 Universidad de Chile (football club), Chilean football club
 Club Universidad Nacional or UNAM Pumas, Mexican football club
 Universidad de Los Andes FC, Venezuelan football club
 Universidad San Carlos or USAC, Guatemalan football club
 Universidad de Santa Cruz Bolivian football Club currently playing Bolivian Football Regional Leagues
 Universidad Independiente, a former club based in San Pedro Sula, Honduras, dissolved in 2010

See also 
 
 Universidad station (disambiguation)
 Universitatea (disambiguation)